John C. Rulon House is located in Swedesboro, Gloucester County, New Jersey, United States. The building was built in 1881 and was added to the National Register of Historic Places on November 22, 2000.

See also
National Register of Historic Places listings in Gloucester County, New Jersey

References

Gothic Revival architecture in New Jersey
Houses on the National Register of Historic Places in New Jersey
Houses completed in 1881
Houses in Gloucester County, New Jersey
National Register of Historic Places in Gloucester County, New Jersey
New Jersey Register of Historic Places
1881 establishments in New Jersey
Swedesboro, New Jersey